Citizens Against Rent Control v. City of Berkeley, 454 U.S. 290 (1981), was a case in which the Supreme Court of the United States invalidated a California law that set limits on contributions to ballot issue campaigns.  The ruling relies heavily on the Court's earlier decisions in Buckley v. Valeo, holding that limits on contributions to political candidates implicate the First Amendment, and First National Bank of Boston v. Bellotti, holding that the state governments have no compelling interest in limiting spending on speech about ballot issues.

See also
List of United States Supreme Court cases, volume 454
Rent regulation

References

External links
 
 Supreme Court of California opinion

United States Free Speech Clause case law
United States Supreme Court cases
United States Supreme Court cases of the Burger Court
United States elections case law
1981 in United States case law
20th century in Berkeley, California
United States case law
Housing in California